MYB proto-oncogene like 1 is a protein that in humans is encoded by the MYBL1 gene.

References

Further reading